The 2001 Pennsylvania 500 presented by Pep Boys was the 20th stock car race of the 2001 NASCAR Winston Cup Series and the 29th iteration of the event. The race was held on Sunday, July 29, 2001, in Long Pond, Pennsylvania, at Pocono Raceway, a 2.5 miles (4.0 km) triangular permanent course. The race took the scheduled 200 laps to complete. In the final laps of the race, Bobby Labonte, driving for Joe Gibbs Racing, would pass eventual second-place driver, Dale Earnhardt, Inc. driver Dale Earnhardt Jr. to win his 17th career NASCAR Winston Cup Series win and his first of the season. To fill out the podium, Tony Stewart, driving for Joe Gibbs Racing, would finish third.

Background 
The race was held at Pocono Raceway, which is a three-turn superspeedway located in Long Pond, Pennsylvania. The track hosts two annual NASCAR Sprint Cup Series races, as well as one Xfinity Series and Camping World Truck Series event. Until 2019, the track also hosted an IndyCar Series race.

Pocono Raceway is one of a very few NASCAR tracks not owned by either Speedway Motorsports, Inc. or International Speedway Corporation. It is operated by the Igdalsky siblings Brandon, Nicholas, and sister Ashley, and cousins Joseph IV and Chase Mattioli, all of whom are third-generation members of the family-owned Mattco Inc, started by Joseph II and Rose Mattioli.

Outside of the NASCAR races, the track is used throughout the year by Sports Car Club of America (SCCA) and motorcycle clubs as well as racing schools and an IndyCar race. The triangular oval also has three separate infield sections of racetrack – North Course, East Course and South Course. Each of these infield sections use a separate portion of the tri-oval to complete the track. During regular non-race weekends, multiple clubs can use the track by running on different infield sections. Also some of the infield sections can be run in either direction, or multiple infield sections can be put together – such as running the North Course and the South Course and using the tri-oval to connect the two.

Entry list 

 (R) denotes rookie driver.

Practice

First practice 
The first practice session was held on Friday, July 27, at 11:30 AM EST. The session would last for two hours and 30 minutes.

Second practice 
The second practice session was held on Saturday, July 28, at 10:45 AM EST. The session would last for 45 minutes.

Third and final practice 
The final practice session, sometimes referred to as Happy Hour, was held on Saturday, June 16, at 12:15 AM EST. The session would last for 45 minutes.

Qualifying 
Qualifying was held on Friday, July 27, at 3:00 PM EST. Each driver would have two laps to set a fastest time; the fastest of the two would count as their official qualifying lap. Positions 1-36 would be decided on time, while positions 37-43 would be based on provisionals. Six spots are awarded by the use of provisionals based on owner's points. The seventh is awarded to a past champion who has not otherwise qualified for the race. If no past champ needs the provisional, the next team in the owner points will be awarded a provisional.

Two drivers would fail to qualify: Andy Hillenburg and Carl Long.

Full qualifying results

Race results

References 

2001 NASCAR Winston Cup Series
NASCAR races at Pocono Raceway
July 2001 sports events in the United States
2001 in sports in Pennsylvania